Robert Wooller (christened 13 February 1817) was an English cricketer who played for Sussex. He was born in Chalvington.

Wooller made a single first-class appearance for the team, against Marylebone Cricket Club in 1850. Wooler scored a duck in the first innings, batting as a tailender, and moved up to the opening order in the second innings, where he scored 2 runs alongside James Dean, who carried his bat until the end of the innings.

External links
Robert Wooller at CricketArchive 

1817 births
English cricketers
Sussex cricketers
Year of death missing
People from Chalvington with Ripe